Metu or METU may refer to:

 Metu, Ethiopia, market town in Ethiopia
 Metu language,  dialect of Derung language
 Middle East Technical University, METU, in Ankara, Turkey

People with the surname
 Chimezie Metu (born 1997), Nigerian-American basketball player
Obinna Metu  (born 1988), Nigerian sprinter